Stephan Thee (born 26 July 1988) is a German footballer who plays as a defensive midfielder for Bayernliga club VfB Hallbergmoos.

Career

Thee came through SpVgg Unterhaching's youth team, and made his debut in a 3–2 win over VfR Aalen December 2008, replacing Anton Fink who had just completed his hat-trick. His next appearance didn't come until the 2010–11 season, over the next two years he became a regular in the Unterhaching first team. In July 2013 he moved to Wacker Burghausen, following his team-mate Maximilian Drum. After Burghausen were relegated from the 3. Liga at the end of the 2013–14 season, Thee signed for VfL Osnabrück.

External links

Stephan Thee at Fupa

1988 births
Footballers from Munich
Living people
German footballers
Association football midfielders
SpVgg Unterhaching II players
SpVgg Unterhaching players
SV Wacker Burghausen players
VfL Osnabrück players
TSV Buchbach players
Türkgücü München players
FC Pipinsried players
VfR Garching players
Oberliga (football) players
3. Liga players
Regionalliga players
Bayernliga players